Colorado Engineering Experiment Station, Inc. is corporation whose primary business is flow meter calibrations.

History
Starting in 1951, the "Engineering Experiment Station" was a program run by the University of Colorado designed for small rocket research and development. The facility tested turbine meters for the Naval Ordnance Test Station located in China Lake, California. In 1966, Dr. Tom Arnberg of the Mechanical Engineering Department aided in moving the facility to Nunn, Colorado in order to separate ties with the university. At its new location, which used to be an Atlas nuclear missile silo, the facility was renamed the "Colorado Engineering Experiment Station, Inc." (or "CEESI" for short) and operated as a non-profit research and testing facility until 1986. In 1986, Walt Seidl and Steve Caldwell purchased the facility and reopened the corporation as a commercial test facility. CEESI expanded the Colorado facility with the addition of the Wet Gas Test Facility in 1998  and the Iowa Natural Gas Facility in 1999.

Management and Engineering Staff
The management and engineering staff includes:

Rich Schoonover, President of Corporate Operations
Joel Clancy, CEESIowa President & Flow Measurement Instructor
Dirk Flournoy, Director of Operations for CEESI Colorado & HSE Director
John Reiner, Director of Quality Assurance & Metrology
Milissa Fowler, Director of Human Resources & Administration 
Bill Johansen, P.E., Director of Engineering/Chief Engineer & Flow Measurement Instructor
Tom Kegel, Principal Engineer & Flow Measurement Instructor
Eric Harman, Principal Engineer, Wet Gas Test Facility & Flow Measurement Instructor
Bryan Trostel, P.E., Senior Engineer
Dan Macey, Senior Engineer & Software Developer
Eric Hirsch, Operations Manager, Main Lab Facilities 
Joshua Kinney, Manager, Wet Gas Facility
James Beeson IV, Manager, Business Intelligence & Information Technology
Damon Myers, P.M.P., Principal Project Manager
Al Luppen, Operations Manager (Iowa Lab)
Tim Hunteman, Manager, Water Lab

CEESI engineers are members of flow measurement standards committees organized by the AGA (American Gas Association), API (American Petroleum Institute), and ASME (American Society of Mechanical Engineers).

Flow meter testing
CEESI has the capability to test a wide range of types of flow meters including turbine, vortex, differential-pressure, Coriolis, magnetic, positive-displacement, cone meter, ultrasonic, as well as a variety of valve types.

Accreditations
Colorado Engineering Experiment Station, Inc. (CEESI) is accredited to ISO/IEC 17025 by the American Association for Laboratory Accreditation (A2LA).

Iowa Natural Gas Facility
CEESI's Iowa facility, in Clear Lake,  it located on a custody transfer location owned by the Northern Border Pipeline Company. This facility flows 1-2 billion cubic feet of natural gas per day. The natural gas used for CEESI meter calibrations is diverted from the Northern Border pipeline, then repressurized and returned into the pipeline after calibrations are completed. The Iowa facility began offering commercial calibrations in April 1999. The first meter calibrated at the Iowa facility was a 12-inch Instromet ultrasonic meter in March 1999. All of the instruments involved in the scale-up were controlled by NIST (National Institute of Standards and Technology) staff and were calibrated using NIST's quality control processes. This scale-up calibration process is repeated regularly in accordance with NIST quality procedures. Flow meter calibration end users have the option to pay NIST to supervise calibrations; these calibrations qualify as NIST calibrations.

Wet Gas Test Facility
In March 1997, several energy companies formed a wet gas JIP (Joint Industry Project) in an attempt to collectively fund gas metering research. Member companies as well as the Gas Research Institute funded the project for three years. CEESI built the Wet Gas Test Facility in 1998 in order to facilitate this flow meter testing on wet or unprocessed natural gas.

International Symposium on Fluid Flow Measurement involvement
The International Symposium on Fluid Flow Measurement (ISFFM) is a conference held every three to four years which focuses on fluid flow measurement. CEESI served as the secretariat for the ISFFM in 1999, 2002, 2006, 2009, 2012, 2015, and 2018.

Measurement Library Development
CEESI created the "CEESI Technical Library" in October 2007 which is a web-based collection of documents and references to papers related to fluid flow measurement. Bibliographic references and thousands of papers, available for free in PDF format, were collected and indexed by CEESI. CEESI made agreements with the American School of Gas Measurement Training, American Gas Association, and the Natural Gas Sampling Technology Conference to allow for the downloading of papers on flow measurement topics. CEESI also reached agreements with the International School of Hydrocarbon Measurement (ISHM) to which resulted in ISHM allowing their publications be made available via download through the library. Similarly, the organizers of the International Symposium on Fluid Flow Measurement (the North American Fluid Flow Measurement Council) also granted CEESI permission to allow users of the Flow Measurement Technical Library to download symposium proceedings. CEESI entered into a partnership with the Pipeline Research Council International (also known as "PRCI") in 2008 which allowed the expansion and further development of the library; the library's name was changed to the “Flow Measurement Technical Library” after this partnership began. By 2012, the following organizations/conferences that have allowed some portion of their papers to be downloadable by the public through the Flow Measurement Technical Library: International School of Hydrocarbon Measurement, International Symposium on Fluid Flow Measurement, Acadiana Flow Measurement Society, American School of Gas Measurement Technologies, National Institute of Standards and Technology, Western Gas Measurement Short Course, Canadian School of Hydrocarbon Measurement, Flow Measurement Institute, South East Asia Hydrocarbon Flow Measurement Workshop, North Sea Flow Measurement Workshop, and the Appalachian Gas Measurement Short Course. In 2017, the name was shortened to "Measurement Library".

References

External links
 ceesi.com
 www.measurementlibrary.com 
 www.isffm.org/secretariat/

Companies based in Colorado